Chaim Dovid Zwiebel is the executive vice president of Agudath Israel of America. Zwiebel joined the organization
as a vice president after first working for four-and-a-half years at a law firm, and was selected for his current position in 2008, after the passing of his predecessor, Moshe Sherer.

He attended Brooklyn College and Cardozo Law School, and worked as a lawyer at Paul, Weiss, Rifkind, Wharton, & Garrison.

Prior involvement
Zwiebel was part of the 1992 effort by "conservative Catholic and Jewish groups", to oppose "right-to-die" proponents who were advocating for legislation to "allow family members to speak for patients who can no longer speak for themselves". At that time, he was serving Agudath Israel as general counsel and director of government affairs.

As executive vice president
Zwiebel helped Agudath Israel organize and operate the August 2012 National Celebration of the 12th Siyum HaShas. The celebration was held in MetLife Stadium. It was the largest gathering of Orthodox Jewry in the history of the United States with 90,000 people in attendance.

As part of an ongoing challenge regarding religious freedom, Zwiebel, described by The New York Times as "leader of an ultra-Orthodox group", was successful in pushing for the repeal by NYC Mayor de Blasio of what The Times had previously called prior Mayor Bloomberg's attempt "to regulate Jewish circumcision".

References

Date of birth missing (living people)
Living people
American Orthodox Jews
American lobbyists
Jewish American community activists
Leaders of organizations
Leaders of Jewish organizations in the United States
Year of birth missing (living people)
21st-century American Jews